This is a list of National Historic Sites in the territory of Northwest Territories.  There are 12 National Historic Sites designated in the Northwest Territories, of which one (Sahoyúé-§ehdacho) is administered by Parks Canada (identified below by the beaver icon ).  The first National Historic Site to be designated in the Northwest Territories was Parry's Rock Wintering Site in 1930.

A number of National Historic Events also occurred in the Northwest Territories, and are identified at places associated with them, using the same style of federal plaque which marks National Historic Sites. Several National Historic Persons are commemorated in the same way. The markers do not indicate which designation—a Site, Event, or Person—a subject has been given.

This list uses names designated by the national Historic Sites and Monuments Board, which may differ from other names for these sites.

National Historic Sites

See also

History of Northwest Territories
List of historic places in Northwest Territories

References

 
Northwest Territories
National Historic Sites of Canada